William W. Popp is an American diplomat who serves as the United States Ambassador to Guatemala.

Education 

Popp earned his Bachelor of Arts, magna cum laude, from Westminster College, his Master of Arts from George Washington University, and his Master of Science in National Security Strategy at the National War College.

Career 

Popp was the Deputy Principal Officer and then Acting Principal Officer at the United States Consulate General in Sao Paulo, Brazil. He also served as the Deputy Economic Counselor of the United States Embassy in Bogota, Colombia. He served as the Political Counselor and then as the Acting Deputy Chief of Mission at the United States Embassy in Nairobi, Kenya. He was also the Director of the Office of Regional Economic Policy and Summit Coordination in the Bureau of Western Hemisphere Affairs at the State Department. He was the Chargé d'Affaires a.i. in Brazil from November 2018 to February 2020. He has been the Deputy Chief of Mission at the U.S. Embassy in Brasilia, Brazil since August 2017.

Ambassador to Guatemala 

On May 28, 2020, President Trump announced his intent to nominate Popp to be the next United States Ambassador to Guatemala. On June 2, 2020, his nomination was sent to the United States Senate. He was confirmed by the U.S. Senate on August 6, 2020 by voice vote. He was sworn into office on August 13, 2020. Popp presented his credentials to Guatemalan President Alejandro Giammattei on October 19, 2020.

Personal life 

He speaks Spanish and Portuguese.

See also
List of ambassadors of the United States

References

Living people
Year of birth missing (living people)
Place of birth missing (living people)
21st-century American diplomats
Ambassadors of the United States to Brazil
Ambassadors of the United States to Guatemala
George Washington University alumni
National War College alumni
United States Department of State officials
Westminster College (Missouri) alumni